Philip Melvin Morrison (October 18, 1894 – January 18, 1955) was a professional baseball player.  He was a right-handed pitcher for one season (1921) with the Pittsburgh Pirates.  For his career, he recorded no decisions and a 0.00 earned run average, with 1 strikeout in ⅔ of an inning pitched.

He was born in Rockport, Indiana and died in Lexington, Kentucky at the age of 60.

References

External links

 

1894 births
1955 deaths
Atlanta Crackers players
Baseball players from Indiana
Birmingham Barons players
Indianapolis Indians players
Major League Baseball pitchers
Pittsburgh Pirates players
People from Rockport, Indiana